Nelson Ramos may refer to:

 Nelson Ramos (artist) (1932-2006), Uruguayan visual artist
 Nelson Ramos (footballer) (born 1981), Colombian footballer